Waters' River, also known as the Robertson Farm, is a historic home located at Manokin, Somerset County, Maryland, United States. It is a large plantation house constructed between 1800 and 1820 on the Big Annemessex River. It is a two-story, Flemish bond brick house with a steeply pitched gable roof.  The interior features a great deal of Federal period detail including the stair and balustrade; mantels; paneled doors and reveals; and baseboard, chair rail, and architrave moldings.

Waters' River was listed on the National Register of Historic Places in 1984.

References

External links
, including photo from 1983, at Maryland Historical Trust

Houses in Somerset County, Maryland
Houses on the National Register of Historic Places in Maryland
Federal architecture in Maryland
Plantation houses in Maryland
National Register of Historic Places in Somerset County, Maryland